"$pringfield (or, How I Learned to Stop Worrying and Love Legalized Gambling)", simply known as "$pringfield", is the tenth episode of the fifth season of the American animated television series The Simpsons, and the 91st episode overall. It originally aired on the Fox network in the United States on December 16, 1993. In the episode, Springfield legalizes gambling to revitalize its economy. Mr. Burns opens a casino where Homer is hired as a blackjack dealer. Marge develops a gambling addiction, Bart opens a casino in his treehouse, and Burns' appearance and mental state deteriorate in a parody of Howard Hughes.

The episode was written by Bill Oakley and Josh Weinstein, and directed by Wes Archer. Gerry Cooney and Robert Goulet guest starred as themselves. The episode features cultural references to the films Dr. Strangelove or: How I Learned to Stop Worrying and Love the Bomb, The Wizard of Oz, Rain Man, and 2001: A Space Odyssey. Since airing, the episode has received mostly positive reviews from television critics. It acquired a Nielsen rating of 11.7, and was the highest-rated show on the Fox network the week it aired.

Plot
At a town hall, Mayor Quimby fields suggestions on ways to improve Springfield's dwindling economy. Principal Skinner suggests the town legalize gambling to rejuvenate its economy; everyone, including frequent naysayer Marge, likes the idea. Mr. Burns and Quimby work together to build a casino, where Homer is hired as a blackjack dealer. Burns designs the casino himself, with his likeness atop a mermaid's body adorning its neon sign.

While waiting for Homer's shift to end, Marge finds a quarter on the casino floor and uses it to play a slot machine. When she wins, she immediately becomes addicted to gambling. Bart is too young to gamble at Burns' Casino, so he starts his own casino in his tree house, tricking Robert Goulet into performing there. Burns grows even richer from his casino, but his appearance and mental state deteriorate, making him resemble Howard Hughes. He develops paranoia and a profound fear of microscopic germs, urinating in jars and wearing tissue boxes instead of shoes on his feet.

Marge spends all her time at the casino and neglects her family. She fails to notice when Maggie crawls away from the slots and is nearly mauled by a white tiger from Gunter and Ernst's circus act. She forgets to help Lisa make a costume for her geography pageant, forcing her to wear one poorly designed by her father, which consists of Homer creating a shoddy costume of "Florida" misspelled as "Floreda" on the front of it. Homer bursts into the casino searching for Marge. Security cameras capture his rampage, causing Burns to demote him to his old job at the power plant. After realizing how much he misses the plant, Burns decides to return to it. When Homer confronts Marge for her behavior, she finally realizes she has a gambling problem and agrees to stop.

Lisa wins a special prize in the geography pageant because Homer's poor costume design makes the judges think she did it all by herself. Ralph receives the same prize for his primitive costume: a note taped to his shirt that reads "Idaho".

Production

The episode was written by Bill Oakley and Josh Weinstein, and directed by Wes Archer. The story of the episode originated from a newspaper article that Oakley and Weinstein found about a town in Mississippi that was introducing riverboat gambling. Oakley said another inspiration for it was that there had not been many episodes about Springfield as a whole and how "crummy" the town was, so they filled the whole first act with scenes showing how "crummy" and "dismal" Springfield was. Oakley particularly liked the animation of the lights inside the casino on the slot machines and the lamps in the ceiling. The "way they radiate out" had always amazed him. Archer, who directed the animation of the episode, also thought they turned out well. The lights were especially hard for them to animate back then because the show was animated traditionally on cels, so Archer was pleased with the results. A deleted scene from the episode shows Homer dealing cards to James Bond. The staff liked the scene, so they decided to put it in the clip show episode "The Simpsons 138th Episode Spectacular".

There was a brief period when the episode had a different subplot that revolved around the restaurant chain Planet Hollywood. Groening had been told by a spokesperson that if he put Planet Hollywood in The Simpsons, the creators of the restaurant, Arnold Schwarzenegger, Bruce Willis, and Sylvester Stallone, would agree to make guest appearances on the show. The writers of The Simpsons were excited about this so they wrote a new subplot for the episode that featured Planet Hollywood and the three actors. However, for unknown reasons, they were unable to appear in the episode.
Instead, Gerry Cooney and Robert Goulet guest starred as themselves. Executive producer David Mirkin enjoyed directing Goulet because he was "such a good sport" and had "a great sense of humor". Oakley thought it was nice that Goulet was willing to make fun of himself in the episode, which at the time was rare for guest stars on The Simpsons. This episode features the first appearances of Gunter and Ernst, the Siegfried and Roy-esque casino magicians who are attacked by their white tiger, Anastasia. Ten years after this episode first aired, Roy Horn was attacked by one of the duo's white tigers. The Simpsons production team dismissed the novelty of the prediction by saying that it was "bound to happen" sooner or later. The Rich Texan also makes his debut appearance in this episode, referred to as "Senator" by Homer.

Cultural references

The title is a reference to the 1964 film Dr. Strangelove or: How I Learned to Stop Worrying and Love the Bomb, the music of which was composed by Laurie Johnson. Two of his songs, "Happy-go-lively" and "Rue de la park" can be heard within the News on Parade segment at the beginning of the episode. Burns' bed looks similar to the one occupied by Keir Dullea's character Dave Bowman in the end of the 1968 film, 2001: A Space Odyssey. Dustin Hoffman and Tom Cruise appear at the casino to reprise their roles from the 1988 film Rain Man, although Cruise does not speak. Homer is impressed by the card-counting abilities of a man who resembles Raymond Babbitt, Hoffman's character in the film. Krusty's show at midnight is similar to Bill Cosby's 1971 album For Adults Only, which was recorded at a casino at midnight. Marge reminds Homer that his lifelong dream was to be a contestant on the television show The Gong Show.

Burns's paranoid obsession with germs and cleanliness, and his refusal to leave his bedroom once the casino opens, parodies American magnate Howard Hughes, who had obsessive–compulsive disorder, and was involved in the casino business in his later years. The "Spruce Moose", an absurdly tiny wooden plane Burns makes in the episode, is a parody of Hughes' impractically enormous wooden plane, derisively nicknamed the Spruce Goose. Homer parodies the scene in the 1939 film The Wizard of Oz when the Scarecrow demonstrates his newly acquired intelligence by (incorrectly) reciting the law that governs the lengths of the sides of an isosceles triangle. Unlike in the film, somebody correctly points out that the Pythagorean theorem recited applies only to right triangles, not isosceles triangles.

Reception

Critical reception
Since airing, the episode has received mostly positive reviews from television critics. DVD Movie Guide's Colin Jacobson commented that "this excellent episode includes a surprising number of concurrent plots. Homer also works in the casino and tries to care for the family without Marge. It balances them deftly and provides great laughs along the way." Adam Suraf of Dunkirkma.net named it the third best episode of the season. He also praised the episode's cultural references. The authors of the book I Can't Believe It's a Bigger and Better Updated Unofficial Simpsons Guide, Warren Martyn and Adrian Wood, wrote: "There's a lovely nod to the earlier episodes in which Marge protests the citizenry's hare-brained ideas at council meetings. A series of bizarre moments rather than a story—we're especially fond of Homer's photographic memory and Mr Burns' descent into insanity—but great fun." Patrick Bromley of DVD Verdict gave the episode a grade of A, and Bill Gibron of DVD Talk gave it a score of 4 out of 5. The episode is Sarah Culp of The Quindecim's eleventh-favorite episode of the show, and one of Les Winan of Box Office Prophets's favorite episodes. A scene from the episode where former United States Secretary of State Henry Kissinger meets Burns was included in the 2002 documentary film The Trials of Henry Kissinger.

Ratings
In its original American broadcast, "$pringfield" finished 35th in the ratings for the week of December 13 to December 19, 1993, with a Nielsen Rating of 11.7, translating to 11 million households. The episode was the highest-rated show on the Fox network that week.

References

External links

 

The Simpsons (season 5) episodes
1993 American television episodes
Gambling and society
Works about addiction
Cultural depictions of Henry Kissinger
Television episodes about gambling
Obsessive–compulsive disorder in fiction
Fiction about animal cruelty